Santosh Shah is a Nepalese chef based on London, known for competing in the UK’s reality cookery TV series BBC MasterChef: The Professionals in 2020. Declared second runner up, Santosh is credited for popularising Nepalese cuisine in the UK. In 2021, Santosh once again, competed in the UK’s BBC MasterChef: The Professionals Rematch and was declared the winner.

Early life 
Santosh grew up in Karjhana, a small village outside of Kathmandu. When he was nine, he started working as a labourer digging canals to support his family’s financial needs. When he was 14, he travelled to India for his first culinary job as a dishwasher in a five-star hotel. It was at this point that Santosh realised his dream of becoming a chef. He worked under Executive Chef and CEO Vivek Singh for over two years, rising through the hospitality ranks in India. Santosh received his Diploma in Hotel & Catering Management from the Institute of Baroda, India before travelling to London in 2010.

Career 
Santosh worked at some of famous Indian restaurants in London including Dishoom and Michelin-starred Benares, before becoming a sous-chef at Chef Vivek Singh’s Westminster hot spot, The Cinnamon Club. Santosh worked at The Cinnamon Club for several years, before eventually becoming Head Chef at its sister restaurant, Cinnamon Kitchen, in the City. 

In 2018 Santosh was appointed at Executive Chef of the five-star LaLit Hotel in London, where he worked until his appearance on MasterChef in 2020. He is currently working as the Head of The Cinnamon Collection.

Media appearances 
Santosh first appeared on the UK’s reality cookery TV series MasterChef: The Professionals in 2020. He was runner-up in the series and was dubbed as the "People’s Champion." 

In 2021 Santosh competed in MasterChef: The Professionals re-match, where he was declared the winner.

Awards and achievements 

 Runner up: BBC's UK MasterChef: The Professionals 2020

 Winner: BBC’s UK MasterChef: The Professionals Rematch 2021

 Presidential award from Nepal President for promoting Nepali food to the world 2021

 The British Curry award for Restaurant Baluchi 2018

 Conde Nast Award for best fine dining 2018

BBC’s UK MasterChef: The Professionals Rematch 
Santosh won the UK’s BBC MasterChef: The Professionals Rematch on 28th December 2021.The show was judged by Marcus Wareing, Monica Galetti, and Greg Wallace. Santosh defeated three other contestants, two of them Philli Armitage-Mattin and Bart van der Lee, who also appeared on BBC’s UK MasterChef: The Professionals in 2020 with Santosh. Santosh won the title by creating an 18-dish vegan feast inspired by the Dashain festival in Nepal.

Cookbook 
 Ayla: A Feast of Nepali Dishes from Terai, Hills and Himalayas, DK,

References

External links 

 Official website

Living people
People from Siraha District
1985 births
Nepalese chefs
Nepalese emigrants to the United Kingdom